Badamuiyeh (also Romanized as Bādāmū’īyeh; also known as Bādāman, Bādāmīyeh, Bādāmlū, and Badammo’iyeh) is a village in Ekhtiarabad Rural District, in the Central District of Kerman County, Kerman Province, Iran. At the 2006 census, its population was 334, in 96 families.

References 

Populated places in Kerman County